Air supply may refer to:

Ventilation (architecture)
Airlift
Air Supply, a soft rock music duo
Air Supply (1976 album)
Air Supply (1985 album)

See also
Breathing set (disambiguation)
Air compressor
Oxygen